Basket-Hall Krasnodar, or Baskethall-Krasnodar, is a multi-purpose indoor arena that is located in Krasnodar, Russia. The arena is mainly used to host basketball games. The arena contains two basketball halls. The large main hall seats 7,500, and the smaller hall, which is used for training, seats 500. The large main hall also includes an amphitheater section.

History
Basket-Hall Krasnodar opened in 2011. It has been used as the regular home arena of the Russian VTB United League club Lokomotiv Kuban. The arena was renovated in 2017.

See also
 List of indoor arenas in Russia

References

External links
Basket-Hall Arena Krasnodar 360° Virtual Tour
Lokomotiv Kuban Basket-Hall Arena Krasnodar
Basket-Hall Arena Krasnodar Picture

Basketball venues in Russia
Boxing venues in Russia
Indoor arenas in Russia
PBC Lokomotiv-Kuban
Buildings and structures in Krasnodar
Sport in Krasnodar
2011 establishments in Russia
Sports venues completed in 2011